Jelly Christmas is a series of annually released special winter single albums by Jellyfish Entertainment which includes six Christmas singles from their artists. The singles were released on different dates, across six years.

Singles

Jelly Christmas
In December 2010 Jellyfish Entertainment artists came together for the first time for the Jelly Christmas holiday album project with the single "Christmas Time". The participating Jellyfish artists were Sung Si Kyung, Park Hyo-shin, Seo In-guk, Brian Joo, Lisa, Park Hak Ki, Kim Hyeong-jung and Kyun Woo. The single was released on December 6, 2010.

Jelly Christmas 2011
In December 2011, Jellyfish Entertainment artists Sung Si-kyung, Brian Joo, Seo In-guk, Park Hak Ki, Park Jang Hyun and Hwang Project came together again for Jelly Christmas with the single "Christmas for All". The single was released on December 2, 2011.

Jelly Christmas 2012 Heart Project
Jellyfish Entertainment artists Sung Si-kyung, Park Hyo-shin, Lee Seok Hoon, Seo In Guk and VIXX came together for the Jelly Christmas 2012 Heart Project with the single “Because It's Christmas”. It was released on December 5, 2012. The single peaked at number 1 on the digital Gaon Chart. The proceeds from Jelly Christmas 2012 Heart Project was donated to The Salvation Army Korea.

겨울 고백 (Jelly Christmas 2013)
In December 2013, VIXX, Sung Si-kyung, Park Hyo-shin,  Seo In-guk and Little Sister came together for Jelly Christmas 2013 with ”Winter Confession”. It was released on December 12, 2013. The single peaked at number 1 on the digital Gaon Chart. The music video for ”Winter Confession” features a story told in sand animation which give feelings of warmth and romance.

Jelly Christmas 2015 – 4랑
On December 15, 2015 Jellyfish Entertainment released their Jelly Christmas 2015 single album featuring the song, “Love In The Air”. The artists who participated were Seo In Guk, VIXX, former Jewelry member Park JungA and former K-pop Star 4 contestant Park Yoon-ha. The single placed at 14 on the digital Gaon Chart. The music video features Jellyfish actress Kim Gyu-sun, who plays a young woman getting ready for Christmas Eve by recreating her childhood traditions.

Jelly Christmas 2016
On December 13, 2016, Jellyfish Entertainment released their Jelly Christmas 2016 single album featuring the song, "Falling" as part of both their annual Jelly Christmas albums and their digital music channel project Jelly Box. The artists who participated were Seo In-guk, VIXX, Jellyfish Entertainment's first girl group Gugudan, Park Yoon-ha,  Park Jung-ah, Kim Gyu-sun, Kim Ye-won and Jiyul.

Track listing

Release history

Chart performance

References

External links
 Jelly Christmas project page at Jellyfish Entertainment 
 
 
 
 
 
 

Jellyfish Entertainment compilation albums
Stone Music Entertainment albums
Christmas albums by South Korean artists
Jellyfish Entertainment